Thai Civilized Party is a minor political party in Thailand. It was registered on 2 March 2018. Party founders include Mongkolkit Suksintharanon, secretary-general of the National Anti-Corruption Network (an anti-corruption NGO), and social media personality Natchapol Supattana or "Mark Pitbull". On 10 June 2018, the party announced a resolution naming Mongkolkit as party leader and Natchapol as deputy leader, and named anti-corruption, government reform, and social justice as its three core policies. 

The party contested the 2019 Thai general election, fielding candidates in 226 constituencies and submitting 26 party list names. It did not win any of the constituencies, but gained one party list seat and joined the government coalition headed by the Palang Pracharath Party.

On 8 August 2019, party leader Mongkolkit said that Thai Civilized and four other parties would withdraw from the government coalition due to the parties not being assigned any cabinet positions, forming an "independent opposition" separate from the existing coalition. However, following talks, the other parties announced that they would not leave the coalition, thus causing Thai Civilized to leave the government alone, officially doing so on 13 August 2019.

Election results

References 

Political parties in Thailand
Political parties established in 2018
Conservative parties in Thailand